The Bharatiya Janata Yuva Morcha (BJYM) (translation: Indian People's Youth Front) is the youth wing of the Bharatiya Janata Party (BJP), one of the two major political parties in India. It was founded in 1978, and its first national president was Kalraj Mishra.

Organisation
Tejasvi Surya is the youngest president of BJYM since 2020 in the history of National President of BJYM.
Prominent leaders such as Kalraj Mishra, Pramod Mahajan, Rajnath Singh, G. Kishan Reddy, Jagat Prakash Nadda, Uma Bharti, Shivraj Singh Chouhan, Dharmendra Pradhan, Anurag Thakur and Poonam Mahajan have served as national presidents of BJYM in the past.

The National Body of BJYM consists of Tejasvi Surya, the BJYM President, Vice Presidents, General Secretaries, Secretaries, Social Media & IT incharges and National Executives Members.

Activities

Attack on Delhi Chief Minister's house

Campaigns 

Millennium मतदाता

Vijay Lakshya 2019

List of presidents

References

External links

 
Youth wings of political parties in India
Youth wings of conservative parties
Bharatiya Janata Party organisations
1978 establishments in Delhi
Organizations established in 1978